Joni Myllykoski (born July 2, 1984 in Tornio) is a Finnish ice hockey goaltender. He currently plays for JYP in the SM-liiga.

References

JYP Jyväskylä players
1984 births
Living people
People from Tornio
Finnish ice hockey goaltenders
Sportspeople from Lapland (Finland)